Vayu Vajra (meaning: Air diamond) is an Indian public bus transportation service in Bengaluru, India. They are air conditioned Volvo buses colored blue, operated by BMTC. The buses carry people from the city centre to the Kempegowda International Airport, located in the suburban village of Devanahalli.

References

External links

Official website

Bus transport in Karnataka
Transport in Bangalore